The World We Knew, also known as Frank Sinatra, is a 1967 studio album by American singer Frank Sinatra.

The album's title track reached No. 30 on the US Billboard Hot 100 chart and #1 on the Easy Listening chart in 1967. Its second track, "Somethin' Stupid"—a duet between Sinatra and his daughter Nancy—reached No. 1 on both charts.

Reception

Music critic Stephen Thomas Erlewine, in his review of the album for Allmusic, awarded it two-and-a-half out of five stars, and described it as, "More of a singles collection than a proper album [...] Much of this has a rock-oriented pop production, complete with fuzz guitars, reverb, folky acoustic guitars, wailing harmonicas, drum kits, organs, and brass and string charts that punctuate the songs rather than provide the driving force [...] the songs Sinatra tackles with a variety of arrangers are more ambitious than most middle-of-the-road, adult-oriented soft rock of the late '60s." Erlewine described the album's ninth track, "Drinking Again", as "exceptional, nuanced" and said that it "ranks among the best songs Sinatra cut during the '60s."

Track listing

Notes
Carson Parks is also known as C. Carson Parks 
Jim Harbert is also known as James Harbert
Overdubs for "The World We Knew (Over and Over)" recorded on June 30 and July 1, 1967
The Orchestra on "Somethin' Stupid" includes 10 Violins
Background Vocals on "Don't Sleep in the Subway" recorded on July 27, 1967
Basic Backing Tracks for (and Overdubs for unreleased version of) “This Town” was recorded on June 30, 1967
Instrumental Overdubs for "This Town" recorded on July 27, 1967
The Orchestra on "You Are There" includes 16 Violins, 6 Cellos, 3 French Horns and 7 Saxophones & Woodwinds
The Orchestra on "Drinking Again" includes 12 Violins
The Orchestra on Tracks 3-4 and 7 includes 21 Violins, 3 Cellos and 4 French Horns
The Orchestra on Tracks 3-4 and 7-8 includes 6 Violas
The Orchestra on Tracks 5, 8 and 10 includes 5 Trumpets
The Orchestra on Tracks 5 and 10 includes 8 Violins
Sessions held in United-Western Studios, Hollywood, California.

Personnel

Vocalists
 Frank Sinatra – vocals (1-4, 6-10, lead on 5)
 Betty Jane Baker – background vocals (5)
 Peggy Clark – background vocals (5)
 Gwenn Johnson – background vocals (5)
 Nancy Sinatra – vocals (2)
 Sally Stevens – background vocals (5)
 Jackie Ward – background vocals (5)
 Gloria Wood – background vocals (5)

Leaders
 H. B. Barnum – arranger, conductor (10)
 Ernie Freeman – arranger (1, 5, 7), conductor (5, 7)
 Gordon Jenkins – arranger (3-4, 8), conductor (3-4, 7-8)
 Claus Ogerman – arranger (9), conductor (2, 9)
 Billy Strange – arranger (2, 6), conductor (1-2, 6, 8)

Instrumentalists

 Bob Alexander – trombone (8)
 Wayne Andre – trombone (8)
 Chuck Berghofer – string bass (1, 5–6, 10), Fender bass (1)
 Hal Blaine – drums (2, 5–6, 9-10, additional on 1)
 Eddie Brackett Jr. – drums (4, 7, 9, overdubs on 6), percussion (4, 7, 9)
 Dennis Budimir – guitar (1)
 Al Caiola – guitar (1, 6, 8)
 Glen Campbell – guitar (2, 5–6, 10)
 Frank Capp – percussion (5-6, 10)
 Alvin Casey – guitar (2, 5–6, 10)
 Tony Terran – trumpet (2, 5, 6, 9, 10)
 Roy Caton – trumpet (2, 9)
 Gary Chester – drums (1, 6, 8)
 Gary Coleman – additional percussion (1)
 Irv Cottler – drums, percussion (9)
 George Devens – percussion (1, 6, 8)
 Jesse Ehrlich – cello (5, 10)
 Nick Fatool – drums, percussion (4, 7)
 Paul Faulise – bass trombone (8)
 Victor Feldman – percussion (2, 5–6, 9-10)
 Stan Freeman – piano (1, 6, 8)
 Eric Gale – guitar (1, 6, 8)
 Bert Gassman – oboe (3-4, 7)
 Bobby Gibbons – guitar (1)
 Arthur Gleghorn – flute (3-4, 7, 9)
 Bill Green – saxophone, woodwind (5, 10)
 Al Hendrickson – guitar (3-4, 7)
 Lloyd Hildebrand – bassoon (3-4, 7)
 Milt Hinton – string bass (1, 8)
 Milt Holland – string bass (6), additional percussion (1)
 James Horn – saxophone, woodwind (5, 10)
 Harry Hyam – viola (5, 10)
 Dick Hyde – trombone (5, 10, additional on 1)
 Carol Kaye – electric bass (2), string bass (1), Fender bass (1, 5–6, 10)
 Lawrence Knetchel – string bass (1, overdubs on 6), Fender bass (1)
 Robert Knight – bass trombone (5, 10)
 Arthur Koblentz – oboe (3-4, 7)
 Phil Kraus – percussion (1, 6, 8)
 Ronny Lang – clarinet (9)
 Donnie Lanier – guitar (1, 5–6, 10)
 Carl Lynch – guitar (1, 6, 8)
 Lew McCreary – trombone (5, 10, additional on 1)
 Michael Melvoin – piano (5-6, 10, overdubs on 6)
 Bill Miller – piano (2-5, 7, 10)
 Keith Mitchell – string bass (3-4, 7)
 Oliver Mitchell – trumpet (2, 9)
 Louis Morell – guitar (1, 5–6, 10)
 Buddy Morrow – trombone (8)
 Alex Neiman – viola (5, 10)
 Dick Noel – trombone (9)
 Donald Owens – piano (2)
 Ralph Peña – string bass (2)
 Bucky Pizzarelli – guitar (1, 6, 8)
 Don Randi – additional piano (1)
 Morris Repass – trombone (5, 10)
 Blake Reynolds – clarinet (3-4, 7)
 Bobby Rosengarden – drums (1, 3–8, 10)
 Margaret Ross – harp (8)
 Ethmer Roten – flute, clarinet (3-4, 7)
 Joseph Saxon – cello (5, 10)
 Bud Shank – flute (9)
 Lou Singer – drums, percussion (4, 7)
 Wayne Songer – clarinet (3-4, 7)
 Ann Mason Stockton – harp (3-4, 7)
 Sheridon Stokes – flute, clarinet (3-4, 7)
 Toots Thielemans – harmonica, guitar (1, 6, 8)
 Moe Wechsler – piano (1, 6, 8)

References

1967 albums
Frank Sinatra albums
Albums arranged by Claus Ogerman
Albums conducted by Gordon Jenkins
Albums arranged by Gordon Jenkins
Albums arranged by H. B. Barnum
Albums produced by H. B. Barnum
Albums conducted by Claus Ogerman
Reprise Records albums